Juan Valera y Alcalá-Galiano (18 October 1824 – 18 April 1905), was a Spanish realist author, diplomat, and politician.

Life
He was born at Cabra, in the province of Córdoba, and was educated at Málaga and at the University of Granada, where he took his degree in law, and then entered upon a diplomatic career (1847). Over the next five decades, Valera filled a number of positions in a variety of places.  He accompanied the Spanish Ambassador to Naples. Afterwards, he was a member of the Spanish legations at Lisbon (1850), Rio de Janeiro (1851–53), Dresden and St. Petersburg (1854–57 with the Duke of Osuna). He wrote about the latter mission in Cartas desde Rusia, poking "gentle fun" at his fellow diplomat, Mauricio Álvarez de las Asturias Bohorques y Guiráldez, the third Duke of Gor. After his return to Madrid, he became one of the editors of the liberal journal El Contemporáneo (1859), and was appointed Minister to Frankfurt (1865). After the revolution of 1868 he was appointed Assistant Secretary of State and (1871) Director of Public Instruction.  During the reign of Alphonso XII he was Minister to Lisbon (1881–83), Washington (1883–86), and Brussels (1886–88), and in 1893-95 Ambassador to Vienna. He was elected to the Academy of Moral and Political Sciences in 1900.

Throughout his diplomatic and political activity he produced works which rank among the highest that his country's literature contains. For purity of diction and beauty of style Valera has never been surpassed in Spain. Pepita Jiménez, which appeared as a serial in 1874, is probably his best known work; it has since been translated into many languages. It depicts the gradual realization by a young seminarian of the empty vanity of his vocation, culminating in a shattering denouement. All of the foregoing novels were written around the time when he abandoned his political activities. He was also a supporter of Iberian Federalism.

Literature
 
 Juan Valera, Obras Completas (Madrid, 1905 et seq., 43 volumes to 1916)
 Juan Valera, The Illusions of Doctor Faustino, translated by Robert M. Fedorchek. The Catholic University of America Press (2008)
 Juan Valera, Juanita la Larga, translated by Robert M. Fedorchek. The Catholic University of America (2006)
 Ferdinand Brunetière, La casuistique dans le roman de Juan Valera, in his series Histoire et littérature, volume i (Paris, 1884)
 Emilia Pardo Bazán, "Retratos y apuntes literaros," in Obras completas, volume xxxii (Madrid, 1891 et seq.)
 Conde de Casa Valencia, Necrologia de ... D. J. V. (Madrid, 1905)
 Conde de las Navas, Don Juan Valera (Madrid, 1905)
 J. D. Fitz-Gerald, "Juan Valera," in The Bookman, volume xxi (New York, 1905)
 Karimi, Kian-Harald (2007): Jenseits von altem Gott und ‘Neuem Menschen’. Präsenz und Entzug des Göttlichen im Diskurs der spanischen Restaurationsepoche. Frankf./M.: Vervuert. 
 F. Vézinet, Les maitres du roman aspagnol contemporain (Paris, 1907)

References

External links 
 
 
 

1824 births
1905 deaths
People from the Province of Córdoba (Spain)
Ambassadors of Spain to Austria-Hungary
Ambassadors of Spain to the United States
Ambassadors of Spain to Portugal
Ambassadors of Spain to Belgium
Spanish novelists
Spanish male novelists
Spanish journalists
Members of the Royal Spanish Academy
Members of the Académie des sciences morales et politiques
19th-century Spanish novelists
19th-century male writers
Christian novelists